The BCCI Platinum Jubilee match was played between India and Pakistan on 13 November 2004 at Eden Gardens in Kolkata, as a part of BCCI's week-long platinum jubilee celebrations to commemorate 75 years of the board's existence.

Squads

Match

Details 
India won the toss and elected to bat first. Openers Sachin Tendulkar and Virender Sehwag gave India a good start before Tendulkar was run-out for 16 runs. However, India continued to score at a good pace with VVS Laxman joining Sehwag for a partnership of 92 runs. Once Laxman and Sehwag were dismissed by Shahid Afridi for 43 runs and 53 runs respectively, captain Sourav Ganguly played a cautious innings of 48 runs after Rahul Dravid was dismissed cheaply. Yuvraj Singh was the top-scorer for the Indian team with 78 runs off 62 deliveries, including 10 fours and 2 sixes. India finished their innings at 292/6.

Pakistan, in reply, lost Younis Khan for 0 with Zaheer Khan taking his wicket. After his dismissal, Salman Butt and Shoaib Malik stitched a partnership of 113 runs before Butt retired hurt on 68* when Pakistan were 155/2. Captain Inzamam-ul-Haq was joined by Malik before Sehwag dismissed him for 61 runs. Butt, who had retired to the pavilion, returned to play and scored a match-winning century along with Inzamam, who contributed 75 runs in their 98-run partnership to take the match away from India. Pakistan reached their target of 293 runs for the loss of 4 wickets with an over to spare, with Butt remaining unbeaten on 108 runs off 130 deliveries.

Scorecard 

 1st innings

Fall of wickets: 1–29 (Tendulkar, 5.3 ov), 2–111 (Laxman, 4.2 ov), 3–124 (Sehwag, 21.5 ov), 4–163 (Dravid, 32.4 ov), 5-237 (Ganguly, 44.2 ov), 6-290 (Yuvraj Singh, 49.5 ov)

 2nd innings

Fall of wickets: 1-15 (Younis Khan, 3.2 ov), 2-128 (Shoaib Malik, 23.5 ov), 2-155 (28.2 ov), 3-186 (Mohammad Yousuf, 35.5 ov), 4-284 (Inzamam-ul-Haq, 48.2 ov)

References 

2004 in Indian cricket
2004 in Pakistani cricket
International cricket competitions in 2004–05
November 2004 sports events in Asia
Cricket in Kolkata
2000s in Kolkata